Argo is a free-to-play multiplayer first-person shooter video game developed by Bohemia Interactive. The initial prototype of the game, Project Argo, was released on 1 November 2016 as part of Bohemia Incubator. The game was released as Argo on 22 June 2017. On June 26, 2018 the developers announced that official servers are shutting down, only allowing unofficial server support.

Gameplay
Argo is set on a fictional island called Malden (the setting of Bohemia's previous game Operation Flashpoint: Cold War Crisis). Mercenaries are deployed to Malden by two rival factions and have to fight over the remnants of a crashed space station. The game is similar to Arma 3 but is less focused on realism and military simulation.

Players can choose from multiple game modes. There is a mode called "Combat Patrol" in which players can fulfill procedurally generated tasks scattered across the island. Another mode "Link" is about fighting on a smaller scale, in which both teams have to hack a central computer. "Raid" is a battle of attackers and defenders. "Clash" is similar to "Link" but fighting takes place on a larger area.

Argo also features a scenario editor. Argos editor is limited in comparison with Arma 3.

References

External links

2017 video games
Bohemia Interactive games
Cooperative video games
First-person shooters
Multiplayer video games
Multiplayer online games
Open-world video games
Video games developed in the Czech Republic
Video games set on fictional islands
Video games with user-generated gameplay content
War video games
Windows games
Windows-only games